Lev Kuznetsov is the name of:

 Lev Kuznetsov (fencer) (1930–2015), a Soviet Olympic fencer
 Lev Vladimirovich Kuznetsov (born 1965), a Russian politician